Robert Jüttner (born 24 November 1959) is a former professional German footballer.

Jüttner made four appearances for Hertha BSC during the 1982–83 Fußball-Bundesliga season.

References

External links 
 

1959 births
Living people
German footballers
Association football defenders
Association football midfielders
Bundesliga players
2. Bundesliga players
Hertha Zehlendorf players
Hertha BSC players
Tennis Borussia Berlin players